DJ-Kicks: Kemistry & Storm is a DJ mix album, mixed by Kemistry & Storm. It was released on 25 January 1999 on the Studio !K7 independent record label as part of the DJ-Kicks series.

Track listing
 "Trauma" - Dom & Roland – 3:19
 "Ole" - John B – 4:27
 "Submerged" - Architex & DJ Loxy – 2:42
 "Fuse" - Dillinja – 4:03 
 "Mission Accomplished" - Digital & Spirit – 3:07
 "Clear Skyz" - DJ Die – 3:40
 "Closing In" - Bill Riley – 3:49
 "Everywhere I Go (Remix)" - Sci-Clone – 4:27
 "Stash" - Decoder – 5:19 
 "Hyaena" - Goldie – 2:45
 "Uneasy" - Jonny L – 2:39
 "Pressure" - John B – 5:01
 "Venom" - Primary Motive – 3:39
 "Space Jam" - J Majik – 4:13
 "Static (K7 Mix)" - Lemon D – 5:39 
 "Code" - Absolute Zero & Subphonics – 4:24
 "Tronik Funk" - Dillinja – 2:52 

Tracks 4, 15 and 17 are credited to "Test" aka "Test Press" on the album.

Personnel 

Absolute Zero – Performer
Architex – Performer
John B. – Performer
Decoder – Performer
DJ Die – Performer
DJ Loxy & Usual Suspects – Performer
Goldie – Performer
Kemistry & Storm – DJ
J Majik – Performer
Primary Motive – Performer
Bill Riley – Performer
Marc Schilkowski – Design
Sci-Clone – Performer
Test – Performer
Chris Zippel – Mastering

References

External links 
DJ-Kicks website

Kemistry and Storm
1999 compilation albums